The 1963 Pan American Games were held from April 20 to May 5, 1963, in São Paulo, Brazil.

Host city selection 

For the first time, two cities submitted bids to host the 1963 Pan American Games that were recognized by the Pan American Sports Organization (PASO). On August 25, 1959, São Paulo was selected over Winnipeg to host the IV Pan American Games by the PASO at the VII Pan American Sports Congress in Chicago, United States.

Medal count 

Note
 The medal counts for the United States, Canada and Argentina are disputed. (details)

Participating nations 

According to the Brazilian Olympic Committee, twenty-two nations sent competitors to São Paulo, but only twenty-one were listed. Barbados took part in the Pan American Games for the first time. Costa Rica, Haiti, Nicaragua and the Dominican Republic competed in 1959 but did not participate in the 1963 Games.

Sports

Venues 

The games used 11 different venues:

Pacaembu Stadium - athletics and opening and closing ceremonies
Parque São Jorge and Estádio Nicolau Alayon - football (soccer)
Ibirapuera Gymnasium - basketball
Palestra Itália Stadium - volleyball
Ibirapuera Park - cycling
Estádio do Bom Retiro - baseball
Esporte Clube Pinheiros - diving, swimming, water polo
Pinheiros Tênis Clube - tennis
Sociedade Hipica de São Paulo - equestrian
Reservoir of Guarapiranga - sailing
Raia Olímpica da USP - rowing

References

External links
 São Paulo 1963 - IV Pan American Games - Official Report at PanamSports.org

 
Pan American Games
Pan American Games
Pan American
Pan American Games
International sports competitions in São Paulo
April 1963 sports events in South America
May 1963 sports events in South America
20th century in São Paulo